Paul Warwick Thompson FRSA (born 9 August 1959) is rector of the Royal College of Art in London, England.

Paul Thompson was educated at Bryanston School, the University of Bristol (BA) and the University of East Anglia (MA, PhD).

Thompson worked as a scriptwriter and researcher for the Design Council 1987–88. He then joined the Design Museum as Curator of Contemporary Design and in 1993–2001 was its Director.

During 2001–09, Thompson was Director of the Cooper Hewitt, Smithsonian Design Museum in New York City, USA. In 2009, he took up his current post at the Royal College of Art. He is a Trustee of the Victoria and Albert Museum, London, and on the Board of Visitors of the Ashmolean Museum at the University of Oxford. He is a member of the Wellcome Collection Programme Advisory Committee at the Wellcome Trust, London. He is an adjunct professor at Imperial College's Institute for Global Health Innovation. He co-directs the Helix Centre with Professor Lord Ara Darzi. The Helix Centre is a design research centre based in St Mary's Hospital, London.

References

External links
 Dr Paul Thompson web page

1959 births
Living people
People from Oxford
People educated at Bryanston School
Alumni of the University of Bristol
Alumni of the University of East Anglia
English curators
Smithsonian Institution people
Directors of museums in the United Kingdom
Directors of museums in the United States
People associated with the Victoria and Albert Museum
People associated with the Ashmolean Museum
Wellcome Trust
Academics of Imperial College London
Rectors of the Royal College of Art
English art historians